The State Police Services (SPS), also simply known as State Police, are the police services under the control of respective state governments of the States and union territories of India.

Recruitment

The recruitment to this service is done by the respective State Governments, usually through State Public Service Commissions. Some of the posts are recruit by the Staff Selection Commission, the staff conducted the exam all over India and recruit according to eligibility. The recruitment to SPS is also on the same pattern as that for IPS. The only difference is that the recruitment of SPS officers is made by the State Public Service Commission concerned through usually a combined competitive examination for State Civil Services which in the case of IPS is through the All-India Civil Services Examination conducted by Union Public Service Commission. However, in case of Union Territory, recruitment to SPS is also made by Union Public Service Commission through the Civil Services Examination as one of the Group-A (Junior Branch)  Services. State police requirement in large States like Tamil Nadu, Uttar Pradesh, Madhya Pradesh, Bihar, Rajasthan, Maharashtra and Andhra Pradesh is greater as compared to the smaller States like Himachal Pradesh, Punjab, Haryana, Kerala, Sikkim and north-eastern States. After selection, which again is based upon the choice of service and merit of a candidate, selected candidates are required to undergo vigorous probationary training before getting posted as Assistant Commissioner of Police (ACP) or Deputy Superintendent of Police (DSP). States with large number of population are arranging a specific recruitment program for specific recruitment. In June 2017, The Madhya Pradesh state arranged the examination of police constable recruitment through the professional examination board of Madhya Pradesh.

Ranks and insignia of SPS officers

Ranks of Gazetted officers
Gazetted officers include all the Indian Police Service
officers and all state police service officers.

National Emblem above two star (same insignia and pay band as a colonel in the Indian Army)
 Superintendent of police (selection grade)
Other officers above selection grade

National Emblem above one Star (same insignia and pay band as a lieutenant-colonel in the Indian Army)
Superintendent of police
Commandant of Battalion

National Emblem (same insignia and pay band as a major in the Indian Army)

Additional superintendent of police

Three Stars (same insignia as a captain in the Indian Army; pay band of a Lieutenant)
Assistant Commissioner of Police or Deputy Superintendent of Police
Circle Officer (CO) in the states of Rajasthan and Uttar Pradesh
Sub-Divisional Police Officer (SDPO)

List of state police
 Andhra Pradesh Police
 Arunachal Pradesh Police
 Assam Police
 Bihar Police
 Chhattisgarh Police
 Goa Police
 Gujarat Police
 Haryana Police
 Himachal Pradesh Police
 Jharkhand Police
 Karnataka Police
 Kerala Police
 Madhya Pradesh Police
 Maharashtra Police
 Manipur Police
 Meghalaya Police
 Mizoram Police
 Nagaland Police
 Odisha Police
 Punjab Police
 Rajasthan Police
 Sikkim Police
 Tamil Nadu Police
 Telangana Police
 Tripura Police
 Uttar Pradesh Police
 Uttarakhand Police
 West Bengal Police
 Andaman and Nicobar Police
 Chandigarh Police
 Dadra and Nagar Haveli and Daman and Diu Police
 Delhi Police
 Jammu and Kashmir Police
 Ladakh Police
 Lakshadweep Police
 Puducherry Police

See also

 Law enforcement in India
 Indian Penal Code
 Indian Police Service
 Central Armed Police Forces
 State Armed Police Forces
 Delhi, Andaman and Nicobar Islands Police Service
 National Police Memorial and Museum
 Police forces of the states and union territories of India

Notes

References

Law enforcement in India